This list of the prehistoric life of Oklahoma contains the various prehistoric life-forms whose fossilized remains have been reported from within the US state of Oklahoma.

Precambrian
The Paleobiology Database records no known occurrences of Precambrian fossils in Alabama.

Paleozoic

Selected Paleozoic taxa of Oklahoma

 †Abyssomedon – type locality for genus
 †Abyssomedon williamsi – type locality for species
  †Acheloma
 †Acheloma cumminsi – or unidentified comparable form
 †Acheloma dunni – type locality for species
 †Acleistorhinus – type locality for genus
 †Acleistorhinus pteroticus – type locality for species
 †Albertoceras
  †Alethopteris
 †Alethopteris serlii
 †Alexandrinia
 †Alexandrinia directa – type locality for species
 Ammodiscus
 †Amphiscapha
 †Anabathra
 †Ananaspis
 †Anataphrus
 †Angelosaurus
 †Angelosaurus romeri – type locality for species
 † Anisophyllum
  †Annularia
 †Annularia sphenophylloides
 †Annularia stellata
 †Anomphalus
 †Anthracoceras
 †Aphlebia
 †Archaeocidaris
 Archaeolithophyllum
 †Archeria
  †Archimedes
 †Archimedes distans
 †Archimedes meekanoides
 †Archimedes meekanus – or unidentified comparable form
 †Arkanites
 †Aspidosaurus – or unidentified comparable form
 †Athyris
 †Atrypa
  †Aviculopecten
 †Aviculopecten halensis
 †Aviculopecten multilineatus
 †Aviculopecten nodocosta – type locality for species
 †Avonia – tentative report
 †Axinolobus
 †Baeotherates – type locality for genus
 †Baeotherates fortsillensis – type locality for species
  †Bellerophon
 †Benthamaspis
 †Bicornella
 †Bilinguites
 †Bisatoceras – type locality for genus
 †Bolbocephalus
  †Bolosaurus
 †Bolosaurus grandis – type locality for species
 †Bolosaurus striatus
 †Bolterpeton – type locality for genus
 †Bothriocidaris
  †Cacops
 †Cacops morrisi – type locality for species
 †Cacops woehri – type locality for species
 †Calamites
 †Callipteris
 †Calymene
 †Calymene clavicula
 †Calyptaulax
 †Camarotoechia
 † Camerate
 †Campbelloceras
 †Cancelloceras
 †Capnophyllum
  †Captorhinus
 †Captorhinus aguti
 †Cardiocephalus
 †Cardiocephalus peabodyi – type locality for species
 †Cardiocephalus sternbergi – or unidentified comparable form
 †Carolinites
 †Ceramopora
 †Ceratiocaris
 †Ceratocephala
 †Ceraurinella
 †Ceraurus
  †Cheirurus
 †Chonetes
 †Chonetes mesoloba
 †Cladochonus
 †Cleiothyridina
 †Cleiothyridina orbicularis
 †Clepsydrops
 Cliona
 †Colobomycter – type locality for genus
 †Colobomycter pholeter – type locality for species
  †Composita
 †Composita mexicana
 †Composita rotunda
 †Composita subcircularis
 †Composita subtilita
 †Coolinia
 †Cordania
 †Cordania falcata
 †Cordylodus
 †Cornulites
  †Cotylorhynchus – type locality for genus
 †Cotylorhynchus bransoni – type locality for species
 †Cotylorhynchus romeri – type locality for species
 Crania
 †Craniops
 †Cravenoceras
  †Cricotus
 †Crossotelos – type locality for genus
 †Ctenacanthus – report made of unidentified related form or using admittedly obsolete nomenclature
 †Curtognathus
 †Cybelopsis
 †Cycloceras
 †Cyclonema
  †Cyclopteris
 †Cyphaspis
 †Cyrtograptus
 †Cystodictya
 †Cystodictya elegans – type locality for species
  †Dalmanites
 †Delorhynchus – type locality for genus
 †Delorhynchus cifellii – type locality for species
 †Delorhynchus priscus – type locality for species
 †Diacalymene
 †Diadectes
 †Dicoelosia
 †Dicranurus
 †Dicranurus hamatus
 †Dictyonema
 †Dimeropygiella
  †Dimetrodon
 †Dimetrodon dollovianus
 †Dimetrodon limbatus – or unidentified comparable form
 †Dimetrodon loomisi
 †Dimetrodon macrospondylus
  †Diplocaulus – type locality for genus
 †Diplocaulus magnicornis
 †Diplograptus
 †Discitoceras
 †Doleserpeton – type locality for genus
 †Domatoceras
 †Eatonia
 †Echinaria
 †Echinosphaerites
 †Ectosteorhachis
  †Edaphosaurus
 †Edaphosaurus cruciger
  †Edestus – type locality for genus
 †Edmondia
 †Eodictyonella
 †Eospirifer
 †Epiphyton
  †Eryops
 †Eryops megacephalus
 †Estheria
 †Eucalyptocrinites
 †Euryodus
 †Euryodus dalyae – type locality for species
 †Euryodus primus – or unidentified comparable form
 †Favosites
 †Fayella – type locality for genus
 †Feeserpeton – type locality for genus
 †Feeserpeton oklahomensis – type locality for species
  †Fenestella
 †Fenestella cestriensis
 †Fenestella exigua
 †Foerstia
 †Fragiscutum
 †Frencrinuroides
 †Fusulina
 †Gastrioceras
 †Girvanella
 †Glaphurochiton
 †Glyptopleura
 †Gnathodus
  †Gnathorhiza
 †Goniatites
 †Gotlandochiton
 †Gymnophyllum
 †Gymnophyllum wardi
 †Hallopora
  †Halysites
 †Hapsidopareion – type locality for genus
 †Hapsidopareion lepton – type locality for species
 †Helminthochiton
 †Hibbertia
 †Hindia
 †Holopea – tentative report
 †Huntoniatonia
 †Idiognathodus
 †Illaenus
  †Isotelus
 †Ivoechiton
 †Jeffersonia
 †Kainops
 †Kawina
 †Kennedya
 †Kockelella
 †Krausella
 †Labidosaurikos – type locality for genus
  †Labidosaurus
 †Leonaspis
 †Lepidodendron
 Lingula
 †Lingulella
 †Liroceras
 †Lisca
 Lithophaga
 †Llistrofus – type locality for genus
 †Lonchodomas
 †Lutesvillia
  †Lysorophus
 †Macroleter
 †Macroleter agilis – type locality for species
 †Marsupiocrinus
 †Maximites
 †Mcqueenoceras
 †Meganeuropsis
 †Meristella
 †Meristina
 †Metacoceras
 †Michelinoceras
  †Micraroter – type locality for genus
 †Micraroter erythrogeios – type locality for species
 †Microleter – type locality for genus
 †Microleter mckinzieorum – type locality for species
 †Micula – tentative report
 †Misthodotes
 Modiolus
 †Monograptus
 †Moravia
  †Mycterosaurus – type locality for genus
 †Mycterosaurus longiceps – type locality for species
 †Nannaroter – type locality for genus
 †Nannospondylus – type locality for genus
  †Naticopsis
 †Naticopsis transversa – type locality for species
 †Neospirifer
 †Neospirifer dunbari
 †Neuropteris
 †Neuropteris heterophylla
 †Neuropteris obliqua
 †Neuropteris rarinervis
 Nucula
 †Odontochile
 †Oinochoe
 † Oliveria
  †Ophiacodon
 †Ophiacodon major
 †Ophiacodon mirus – or unidentified comparable form
 †Ophiacodon uniformis
 †Opisthodontosaurus – type locality for genus
 †Oromycter – type locality for genus
 †Oromycter dolesorum – type locality for species
 †Orovenator – type locality for genus
 †Orovenator mayorum – type locality for species
  †Orthacanthus
 †Orthoceras
 †Oulodus
 †Ozarkodina
 †Ozarkodina confluens
 †Pachylyroceras
  †Paciphacops
 †Paladin
 Palaeoaplysina – tentative report
 †Paleochiton
 †Paralegoceras
 †Pasawioops – type locality for genus
 †Pecopteris
 †Pecopteris hemitelioides
 †Pentremites
 †Peripetoceras
 †Perryella – type locality for genus
 †Petalodus
 †Phillipsia – tentative report
 †Phragmolites
  †Pinnularia
  †Plaesiomys
 †Platyceras
 †Platycrinites
 †Platysomus
 †Platystrophia
 †Plectodonta
 †Pleuracanthus
  †Pleurocystites
 †Plicochonetes
 †Polygnathodella – type locality for genus
  †Polygnathus
 †Prioniodus
 †Prodentalium
  †Proetus
 †Protocaptorhinus
 †Protocaptorhinus pricei
 †Punka
 †Rayella
 †Rayonnoceras
 †Reedops
 †Remopleurides
 †Reteocrinus
 †Rhopalia
  †Rhynchonkos
 †Rhynchonkos stovalli – type locality for species
 Rogerella
 †Sagenodus
 †Sandia
 †Scytalocrinus
  †Seymouria
 †Seymouria baylorensis
 †Sigillaria
 †Sillerpeton – type locality for genus
 †Skenidioides
 Solecurtus
 Solemya – report made of unidentified related form or using admittedly obsolete nomenclature
 †Solenochilus
 †Solenomorpha – tentative report
 †Sowerbyella
 †Sphaerexochus
 †Sphaerocoryphe
  †Sphenophyllum
 †Sphenophyllum emarginatum
 †Sphenophyllum gilmorei
 †Sphenophyllum latifolium – or unidentified comparable form
 †Sphenophyllum stoukenbergi – tentative report
 †Sphenopteris
 †Spirifer
 †Spirifer grimesi
 †Spirifer opimus
 Spirorbis
 †Streptognathodus
 †Stroboceras
  †Strophomena
 †Strophomena costellata
 †Strophomena neglecta
 †Strophomena perconcava – or unidentified comparable form
 †Strophomena planumbona
 †Tainoceras
 †Tarphyceras
 †Tentaculites
 †Tersomius
 †Tersomius texensis – or unidentified comparable form
 †Tetrataxis
 Textularia
 †Thoracoceras
 †Thrausmosaurus – type locality for genus
  †Trimerorhachis
 †Trimerorhachis insignis
 †Urasterella
 †Varanodon – type locality for genus
 †Varanodon agilis – type locality for species
  †Varanops
 †Varanops brevirostris – or unidentified comparable form
 †Vinella
 †Walchia
  †Watongia – type locality for genus
 †Watongia meieri – type locality for species
 †Wilkingia
 †Worthenia
 †Wurmiella
 †Wurmiella excavata
 †Xenacanthus
 Yoldia
 †Zatrachys

Mesozoic

  †Acrocanthosaurus – type locality for genus
 †Acrocanthosaurus atokensis – type locality for species
 †Albanerpeton
 †Albanerpeton arthridion
  †Allosaurus – type locality for genus
 †Allosaurus fragilis – type locality for species
 Ammobaculites
 †Ammobaculites subgoodlandensis – type locality for species
 †Apatosaurus
 †Arcellites
 †Arcellites hexapartitus – or unidentified comparable form
 †Astroconodon
 †Astroconodon denisoni – or unidentified comparable form
 †Astrodon
 †Atokasaurus – type locality for genus
 †Atokasaurus metarsiodon – type locality for species
 †Atokatheridium – type locality for genus
 †Atokatheridium boreni – type locality for species
 †Barosaurus
 †Bernissartia
 †Brachiosaurus
  †Brontosaurus
 †Brontosaurus parvus
 †Camarasaurus
  †Camptosaurus
 †Camptosaurus dispar
 †Caririchnium
 †Caririchnium leonaridii
  †Ceratodus
  †Ceratosaurus – tentative report
 Cythere
 †Cythere concentrica
 †Cythereis
 †Cythereis carpenterae
 †Cythereis mahonae
 †Cythereis subgoodlandensis – type locality for species
 Cytherella
 †Cytherella ovata
 Cytherelloidea
 †Cytherelloidea rhomboidalis – type locality for species
 †Cytherelloidea subgoodlandensis – type locality for species
 Cytheridea
 †Cytheridea amygdaloides
 †Cytheridea oliverensis
 †Cytheridea rotundus – or unidentified comparable form
 Cytheropteron
 †Cytheropteron howelli
 †Cytheropteron trinitiensis
  †Deinonychus
 †Deinonychus antirrhopus
 †Diplodocus
 †Escharoides – tentative report
 †Escharoides nomas – type locality for species
  †Exogyra
 †Exogyra ponderosa
 †Exogyra texana
 †Glyptops
  †Goniopholis
 †Goniopholis stovalli – type locality for species
 †Grallator
 †Gyronchus
 †Gyronchus dumblei
 †Holoclemensia
 †Holoclemensia texana
  †Hybodus
 †Hybodus butleri
 †Kermackia
 †Kermackia texana
  †Koskinonodon
 Lituotuba
 †Lonchidion
 †Lonchidion anitae
 †Magnoavipes
 †Megalosauripus
 †Naomichelys
 †Oklatheridium – type locality for genus
 †Oklatheridium minax – type locality for species
 †Oklatheridium szalayi – type locality for species
 Ostrea
 †Ostrea crenulimargo
  †Palaeobalistum – tentative report
 †Pappotherium
 †Pappotherium pattersoni
 †Paracimexomys – tentative report
 †Paracimexomys crossi – type locality for species
 Paracypris
 †Paracypris siliqua
 Patellina
 †Patellina subcretacea
 Planulina
 †Pleurocoelus
 †Pteraichnus
 †Ptilotodon – type locality for genus
 †Ptilotodon wilsoni – type locality for species
 Pyripora
 Ramphonotus
 †Ramphonotus pedunculatus
 Ramulina
 Reophax
 †Reophax subgoodlandensis – type locality for species
  †Saurophaganax – type locality for genus
 †Saurophaganax maximus – type locality for species
  †Sauroposeidon – type locality for genus
 †Sauroposeidon proteles – type locality for species
 †Stegosaurus
  †Tenontosaurus
 Textularia
 †Textularia conica
 Vaginulina
 †Vaginulina intumescens

Cenozoic

 †Adelphailurus
 †Aelurodon
 †Aelurodon taxoides – or unidentified comparable form
 †Aepycamelus
 †Aepycamelus robustus
 †Agriotherium
 †Agriotherium schneideri
 †Alforjas
 †Alforjas taylori
 Alligator
  †Amebelodon
  †Amphimachairodus
 †Amphimachairodus coloradensis
 †Aphelops
 †Aphelops malacorhinus
 †Arctonasua
 †Arctonasua fricki – type locality for species
 †Astrohippus
 †Astrohippus ansae
 †Barbourofelis
 †Barbourofelis loveorum
 Bison
 †Bison antiquus
  †Bison latifrons – or unidentified comparable form
 Blarina
 †Blarina brevicauda
 †Bootherium
 †Bootherium bombifrons
  †Borophagus
 †Borophagus secundus
 †Buisnictis
 †Buisnictis schoffi – type locality for species
 †Calippus
 †Calippus martini – type locality for species
 †Calippus regulus
  †Camelops
 Canis
 †Canis ferox
 †Canis latrans
 †Carpocyon
 †Carpocyon limosus
  †Castoroides
 †Castoroides ohioensis – or unidentified comparable form
 Chaetodipus
 †Chaetodipus hispidus – or unidentified comparable form
 Coluber
 †Coluber constrictor
 †Copemys
 †Copemys mariae – type locality for species
 †Copemys shotwelli
 †Cormohipparion
 †Cormohipparion occidentale
 Crotalus
 †Crotalus viridis – or unidentified comparable form
  †Cuvieronius
 †Cuvieronius priestleyi
 Cynomys
 †Cynomys ludovicianus
 Dasypus
 †Dasypus bellus
 †Desmathyus
 †Desmathyus brachydontus
  †Dinohippus
 †Dinohippus leidyanus
 †Dipoides
 †Dipoides stovalli
 †Domninoides
 †Domninoides hessei – type locality for species
 †Domninoides knoxjonesi – type locality for species
 Elaphe
 †Elaphe buisi – type locality for species
  †Elaphe obsoleta – or unidentified comparable form
 †Elaphe vulpina
  †Epicyon
 †Epicyon haydeni
 †Epicyon saevus
 Equus
 †Equus excelsus
 †Equus francisci
 †Equus giganteus
 †Equus niobrarensis
 †Equus scotti
  †Euceratherium
 †Euceratherium collinum – type locality for species
 †Eucyon
 †Eucyon davisi
 Felis
 †Felis rexroadensis
 Geochelone
 Geomys
 †Geomys bursarius
 †Gigantocamelus
 †Gigantocamelus spatulus
  †Glyptotherium
 †Glyptotherium arizonae
  †Gomphotherium
 †Gomphotherium obscurum
 Gopherus
 †Hemiauchenia
 †Hemiauchenia macrocephala
 †Hesperoscalops
 †Hesperotestudo
 †Hesperotestudo riggsi
 Heterodon
 †Heterodon nasicus
 †Heterodon platyrhinos
 †Heterodon plionasicus
  †Hipparion
 †Hipparion tehonense
 †Hippotherium
  †Homotherium – type locality for genus
 †Homotherium serum – type locality for species
 †Hypolagus
 †Hypolagus vetus
 Lampropeltis
 †Lampropeltis doliata
 †Lampropeltis getulus
 †Lampropeltis triangulum
 Lasionycteris
 †Lasionycteris noctivagans
 †Leptodontomys
 Lepus
 Lophodytes
  †Lophodytes cucullatus
 Lynx
 †Lynx proterolyncis
 †Macrognathomys
 †Macrognathomys gemmacolis
  †Mammut
 †Mammuthus
  †Mammuthus columbi
 †Mammuthus hayi
 Marmota
  †Megalonyx
 †Megalonyx jeffersonii
 †Megatylopus
 †Megatylopus matthewi
 †Merychippus
 †Merychippus coloradense – or unidentified comparable form
 †Merychyus
 †Merychyus novomexicanus
 Microtus
 †Microtus ochrogaster – or unidentified comparable form
 †Microtus pennsylvanicus
 †Miospermophilus
 †Miospermophilus lavertyi – type locality for species
 †Mylohyus
 †Mylohyus fossilis
 Myotis
 †Myotis yumanensis – or unidentified comparable form
  †Nannippus
 †Nannippus aztecus
 †Nannippus lenticularis
  †Neohipparion
 †Neohipparion eurystyle
 †Neohipparion gidleyi
 †Neohipparion leptode
 Neotoma
 Nerodia
 †Nimravides
 †Nimravides thinobates – or unidentified comparable form
 †Nothodipoides
 †Nothodipoides planus – type locality for species
  †Nothrotheriops
 †Nothrotheriops texanus
 Odocoileus
 †Oklahomalagus
 †Oklahomalagus whisenhunti – type locality for species
 Ondatra
 †Ondatra zibethicus
 Onychomys
 †Onychomys leucogaster – or unidentified comparable form
 Ophisaurus
 †Ophisaurus attenuatus
  †Paramylodon
 †Paramylodon harlani
 †Paranasua
 †Pediomeryx
 †Pediomeryx hemphillensis
 Perognathus
 †Perognathus mclaughlini – or unidentified comparable form
  Peromyscus
 †Peromyscus berendsensis – type locality for species
 †Peromyscus cochrani – or unidentified comparable form
 Pipistrellus
 †Pipistrellus subflavus
 Pituophis
 †Pituophis catenifer
 †Pituophis melanoleucus
  †Platygonus
 †Platygonus vetus – or unidentified comparable form
 †Pleiolama
 †Pleiolama vera
 †Plesiogulo
 †Plesiogulo marshalli
 †Pliogeomys
 †Pliogeomys buisi – type locality for species
  †Pliohippus
 †Pliohippus nobilis
 †Pliohippus pernix
 †Pliotaxidea
 †Pliotaxidea nevadensis – or unidentified comparable form
 Podomys
 †Podomys oklahomensis
  †Procamelus
 †Procamelus grandis – or unidentified comparable form
 †Prodipodomys
 †Pronotolagus
 †Pronotolagus apachensis
 Pseudacris
 †Pseudacris triseriata
 Pseudemys
 †Pseudemys hilli – type locality for species
  †Pseudhipparion
 †Pseudhipparion gratum
 †Pseudhipparion simpsoni
 †Pseudhipparion skinneri
 Reithrodontomys
 †Serbelodon – or unidentified comparable form
  †Smilodon
 †Smilodon fatalis
 Sorex
 †Sorex arcticus
 †Sorex cinereus
 †Sorex palustris
 Spermophilus
 †Spermophilus dotti
 †Spermophilus franklinii
 †Spermophilus rexroadensis
 †Spermophilus richardsonii – or unidentified comparable form
 †Spermophilus tridecemlineatus
  Sthenictis
 Sylvilagus
 Synaptomys
 †Synaptomys bunkeri
 Tamias
 †Tamias striatus
  Tapirus
 †Tapirus haysii
 †Tapirus veroensis
  †Teleoceras
 †Teleoceras fossiger
 †Teleoceras guymonense – type locality for species
 †Teleoceras hicksi
 Terrapene
 †Terrapene parornata – type locality for species
 †Texoceros
 †Texoceros guymonensis – type locality for species
 †Texoceros minorei – type locality for species
 Thamnophis
 †Thamnophis radix
 Thomomys
  †Thomomys talpoides
 †Tregosorex
 †Tregosorex holmani
 †Untermannerix
 †Untermannerix copiosus
 Vulpes
 †Vulpes stenognathus – type locality for species
  †Vulpes velox
 †Yumaceras
 †Yumaceras figginsi – or unidentified comparable form
 Zapus

References
 

Oklahoma